The White House Bicentennial silver dollar is a commemorative silver dollar issued by the United States Mint in 1992.

Legislation
The 1992 White House Commemorative Coin Act authorized the production of a silver dollar to commemorate the 200th anniversary of the laying of the White House cornerstone in 1792. The act allowed the coin to be struck in both proof and uncirculated finishes.

Designs
The obverse design of the coin, designed by Edgar Z. Steever, IV, features the north portico of the White House. The reverse, designed by Chester Y. Martin, features a bust of James Hoban, the original architect of the White House, and the main entrance that he designed.

See also

 List of United States commemorative coins and medals (1990s)
 United States commemorative coins

References

1992 establishments in the United States
Modern United States commemorative coins
White House